Messina is an Italian surname, originating from the city of Messina. Notable people with the surname include:

 Messina Brothers, English crime gang
 Alessandro Messina (cyclist) (born 1941), Canadian cyclist from the 1960 Summer Olympics
 Alessandro Messina (born 1969), Italian economist
 Antonello da Messina (c.1430–1479), Sicilian renaissance painter
 Charles Messina (born 1971), American playwright, screenwriter and director
 Chris Messina (born 1974), American actor and film director
 Chris Messina (open source advocate) (born 1981), American technology evangelist
 Daniele Messina (born 1992), Italian footballer
 David Messina (born 1974), Italian comics artist
 Domenico Messina (born 1962), Italian Football referee 
 Ettore Messina (born 1959), Italian basketball coach
 Francesco Messina (1900–1995), Italian sculptor
 Frank Messina (born 1968), American poet, author and performance artist
 Gaspare Messina (1879–1957), founder of the Patriarca crime family
 Geofforoy Messina (born 1982), French rugby union footballer
 Gerlandino Messina (born 1972), Sicilian Mafia member
 Gina Messina Dysert (born 1975), American activist
 Giuseppe Messina (born 1993), Italian footballer
 Guido Messina (1931–2020), Italian road bicycle and track cyclist 
 Ignazio Messina (born 1964), Italian politician 
 Jack Messina (born 2007), American actor
 Jim Messina (musician) (born 1947), American rock musician and producer
 Jim Messina (political staffer) (born 1969), American political adviser
 Jo Dee Messina (born 1970), American country music artist
 Joe Messina (1928–2022), American guitarist
 Leonardo Messina (born 1955), member of the Sicilian Mafia turned government informant
 Maria Messina (1887–1944), Italian writer
 Matteo Messina Denaro (born 1962), Sicilian Mafia member and fugitive
 Sal Messina (born 1939), American ice hockey commentator
 Tony Messina, American chef

Italian-language surnames